Wahidul Gani (born 22 September 1958) is a former Bangladeshi cricketer who played in one One Day International in 1988, and a coach who is highly regarded for his coaching of young cricketers.

Playing career
Wahidul Gani was a right-arm leg-spin bowler and a lower order batsman. He played his only ODI match for Bangladesh against Pakistan in the Asia Cup at Chittagong MA Aziz Stadium in 1988.

Coaching career
After retiring he dedicated his time to finding and coaching young talented Bangladeshi cricketers. He founded a coaching institution called "Ankur" and trained his students by himself, three times a week, at the indoor facilities of the Abahani Club. One of his students, Mohammad Ashraful, who was discovered by Gani at the age of 11, scored a Test century in 2001 at the age of 16 to become the youngest centurion in Test history. Another of his students, Mohammad Sharif, also started his international career on a high but later lost his place for the national team because of long-term injury.

External links

1958 births
Living people
Bangladesh One Day International cricketers
20th-century Bangladeshi cricketers
Bangladeshi cricket coaches
Cricketers from Dhaka
Bangladeshi cricketers